"I'm Leavin'" is a 1971 song by Elvis Presley. It was written by Sonny Charles and Michael Jarrett.

The song was originally released in 1971 as a single, with "Heart of Rome" (from the album Love Letters from Elvis) on the B-side. In the United States "I'm Leavin'" reached number 36 on Billboard Hot 100 for the week of August 21, 1971. In the UK Singles Chart, it reached number 23 for the week of October 2, 1971.

Later "I'm Leavin'" was included in the 1980 box set Elvis Aron Presley (on the record 8 titled "Lost Singles").

Personnel 
Sourced from Keith Flynn and AFM session logs.
 Elvis Presley – lead vocals
 James Burton – guitar
 Chip Young – guitar
 Charlie Hodge – acoustic rhythm guitar
 Norbert Putnam – bass
 David Briggs – piano
 Charlie McCoy – organ
 Kenneth Buttrey – drums
 The Imperials (Jim Murray, Terry Blackwood, Greg Gordon, Joe Moscheo, Armond Morales) – backing vocals
 Mary Holladay, Ginger Holladay, Millie Kirkham – backing vocals

Charts

References 

1971 songs
1971 singles
Elvis Presley songs
RCA Records singles